Peter Pan: Adventures in Never Land (also known as Peter Pan in Disney's Return to Never Land in North America) is an adventure game which is based on the Disney cartoon character Peter Pan.  These two games were released in 2002. One released for the PlayStation and Windows (and later-released on PSN), and the other for the Game Boy Advance.

Plot
Captain Hook is after some hidden treasure, and it is up to Peter Pan and Tinker Bell to reach the treasure first.

Gameplay
The game is a 3rd-person perspective side-scroller. Peter can fly, as well as use a knife, pixie dust or panpipes. In between levels, players can use the game's currency (feathers) to buy items from an Indian shop.

Critical reception

Metacritic has a rating of 52% based on 5 critic reviews. IGN gave the game a 5.3, writing "anyone who has already hit puberty should feed this one to the crocodiles".

References

External links
 Mobygames

2002 video games
Game Boy Advance games
Peter Pan (franchise)
Peter Pan video games
PlayStation (console) games
PlayStation Network games
Video games developed in France
Video games developed in the United Kingdom
Windows games
Sony Interactive Entertainment games
Single-player video games
Crawfish Interactive games